Vacansoleil–DCM Pro Cycling Team was a Dutch professional road race cycling team. They were a UCI ProTeam and competed in the UCI World Tour. The team was established in 2005, as the successor of P3 Transfer-Batavus, while also taking over many of the riders and staff of Cycle Collstrop, the former team of manager Van der Schueren. Neither Vacansoleil or DCM renewed their sponsorship of the program after the 2013 season.

History
The team made their debut on the road in 2009. The team's title sponsor Vacansoleil is a European company which organizes luxury camping holidays. DCM is a manufacturer of premium quality soil fertility products. Following the loss of Vacansoleil as a sponsor, it was decided to close down the team. However Hilaire van der Schueren announced the creation of a new team at the UCI Professional Continental level with sponsorship from Wanty for the 2014 season.

Final team roster (2013)

Major wins

2009
Stage 4 Étoile de Bessèges, Bjorn Leukemans
Overall Driedaagse van West-Vlaanderen, Johnny Hoogerland
Stage 1, Johnny Hoogerland
Arno Wallaard Memorial, Lieuwe Westra
Overall Tour de Picardie, Lieuwe Westra
Stage 1, Lieuwe Westra
Overall Circuit de Lorraine, Matteo Carrara
Stages 2 & 3  Tour of Belgium, Borut Božič
 Road Race Championships, Sergey Lagutin
Stage 1 Tour de Pologne, Borut Božič
Stage 1 Tour du Limousin, Borut Božič
Stage 6 Vuelta a España, Borut Božič
3rd Paris–Tours, Borut Božič

2010
Stages 1 & 2 Étoile de Bessèges, Borut Božič
Overall Tour of Qatar, Wouter Mol
Kuurne–Brussels–Kuurne, Bobbie Traksel
Ronde van het Groene Hart, Jens Mouris
Ronde van Drenthe, Alberto Ongarato
Overall Tour de Luxembourg, Matteo Carrara
 Road Race Championships, Sergey Lagutin
Stage 4 Vuelta a Burgos, Romain Feillu
Stage 2 Tour de l'Ain, Romain Feillu
Stage 4 Tour de l'Ain, Wout Poels
Druivenkoers Overijse, Björn Leukemans
Grand Prix de Fourmies, Romain Feillu
Stage 4 Tour of Britain,  Wout Poels
Stage 7 Tour of Britain, Borut Božič
Münsterland Giro, Joost van Leijen
Coppa Sabatini, Riccardo Riccò

2011
Stage 2, 3 & 4 Tour Méditerranéen, Romain Feillu
Stage 1 Paris–Nice, Thomas De Gendt
Classic Loire Atlantique, Lieuwe Westra
Hel van het Mergelland, Pim Ligthart
Tour du Finistère, Romain Feillu
Overall Tour de Picardie, Romain Feillu
Stage 2, Romain Feillu
Stage 3 Circuit de Lorraine, Thomas De Gendt
Stage 5 Circuit de Lorraine, Romain Feillu
Prologue Tour of Belgium, Lieuwe Westra
Boucles de l'Aulne, Martijn Keizer
Stage 4 Tour de Luxembourg, Romain Feillu
Stage 5 Tour de Suisse, Romain Feillu
Stage 7 Tour de Suisse, Thomas De Gendt
 Road Race Championships, Sergey Lagutin
 Road Race Championships, Pim Ligthart
Stage 2 Tour de Wallonie, Joost van Leijen
Stage 3 Tour de l'Ain, Wouter Poels
Overall Tour du Limousin, Björn Leukemans
Stage 1, Björn Leukemans
Druivenkoers Overijse, Björn Leukemans
Tour de Vendée, Marco Marcato

2012
 Road Race Championships, Sergey Lagutin
 Time Trial Championships, Lieuwe Westra
 Time Trial Championships, Gustav Larsson
Stage 4 Étoile de Bessèges, Marco Marcato
Stage 1 Paris–Nice, Gustav Larsson
Stage 5 Paris–Nice, Lieuwe Westra
Stage 7 Paris–Nice, Thomas De Gendt
Ronde van Drenthe, Bert-Jan Lindeman
Stage 2 Tour de Picardie, Kenny van Hummel
Stage 20 Giro d'Italia, Thomas De Gendt
Stage 3 Tour de Luxembourg, Wout Poels
Grand Prix of Aargau Canton, Sergey Lagutin
Druivenkoers Overijse, Björn Leukemans
Overall Danmark Rundt, Lieuwe Westra
Stage 5 (ITT), Lieuwe Westra
Paris–Tours, Marco Marcato
Tour de Vendée, Wesley Kreder

2013
Stage 7 Volta a Catalunya, Thomas De Gendt
Stage 1 Tour of California, Lieuwe Westra
Stage 5 Ster ZLM Toer, Pim Ligthart
 National Time Trial Championships, Lieuwe Westra
 National Time Trial Championships, José Rujano
 National Road Race Championships, Johnny Hoogerland
Stage 1 Arctic Race of Norway, Kenny van Hummel
Stage 2 Tour de l'Ain, Grega Bole
Stage 4 Tour de l'Ain, Wout Poels
Druivenkoers Overijse, Björn Leukemans
Amstel Curaçao Race, Johnny Hoogerland

National champions

2009
 Uzbekistan Road Race Sergey Lagutin
2010
 Uzbekistan Road Race Sergey Lagutin
2011
 Dutch Road Race Pim Ligthart
 Uzbekistan Road Race Sergey Lagutin
2012
 Uzbekistan Road Race Sergey Lagutin
 Dutch Time Trial Lieuwe Westra
 Swedish Time Trial Gustav Larsson
2013
 Dutch Time Trial Lieuwe Westra
 Venezuelan Time Trial José Rujano
 Dutch Road Race Johnny Hoogerland

References

External links
 UCI Team Profile

 
Cycling teams based in the Netherlands
Defunct cycling teams based in the Netherlands
Cycling teams established in 2005
Cycling teams disestablished in 2013
Former UCI WorldTeams